Phander Lake is situated in the Phander Village, in Koh-i-Ghizer, Gupis-Yasin District, the westernmost part of the Gilgit–Baltistan region and northernmost territory of Pakistan.  This lake is an important source of fresh water.

Location 

Phander Lake is a lake and is located in Koh-i-Ghizer of Gupis-Yasin, a district of Gilgit-Baltistan. Also, the lake is called Nango Chatt.

See also
Handarap Lake
Khalti Lake

References

External links 

 http://www.iexplorepakistan.com/phander-lake
 http://pk.geoview.info/phander_lake,1552287p
 http://myghizermylife.blogspot.com/
 http://myphander.com

Lakes of Gilgit-Baltistan
Reservoirs in Pakistan
Gupis-Yasin District